Gaspar de Vallier was a Marshall of the Knights of Malta, who was in command of the fortress of Tripoli during the Siege of Tripoli (1551). He was French, from the region of Auvergne ("Langue d'Auvergne"). In Tripoli, he commanded 30 knights and 630 Calabrian and Sicilian mercenaries. The city was captured on 15 August 1551.

Upon his return to Malta, Gaspar de Vallier was heavily criticized by the Grand Master de Homedes, brought in front of a tribunal, and stripped from the habit and cross of the Order.

De Vallier was later rehabilitated by Grand Master Jean Parisot de Valette.

References

Knights of Malta
People from Auvergne
Governors of Tripoli, Libya